Grihapravesh is a Bengali drama film directed by Ajoy Kar. This movie was released on 12 Nov. 1954 in the banner of Naba Chitrabharati Ltd. The music direction was done by Mukul Roy. It stars Uttam Kumar, Suchitra Sen, Bhanu Banerjee, Tulsi Chakraborty, and Anil Chatterjee in the lead roles.

Plot

Cast
 Suchitra Sen 
 Uttam Kumar 
 Anil Chatterjee
 Tulsi Chakraborty 
 Bhanu Bannerjee
 Aparna Devi
 Nripati Chattopadhyay 
 Asha Devi
 Molina Devi 
 Pahari Sanyal 
 Bikash Roy
 Jahar Ganguly
 Manju Dey
 Bijali Mukhopadhyay
 Khagen Pathak

References

External links
 

1954 films
Bengali-language Indian films
1954 drama films
1950s Bengali-language films
Indian drama films